WKSM (99.5 MHz) is a commercial FM radio station licensed to Fort Walton Beach and serving the Emerald Coast of Florida.  It is owned by Cumulus Media and broadcasts a mainstream rock radio format, calling itself 99 Rock.  The radio studios and transmitter are on Hollywood Boulevard NW in Fort Walton Beach.  WKSM has an effective radiated power (ERP) of 50,000 watts.

History
It was the FM simulcast of WFTW 1260 AM. WFTW-FM was originally on 99.3 MHz, broadcasting at 3,000 watts, a fraction of its current output. Both stations were owned by Vacationland Broadcasting. Because WFTW 1260 was a daytimer, WFTW-FM continued the AM station's programming after sunset.

FM 99.3 was a Class A frequency, limited at the time to only local coverage.  So management decided to move WFTW-FM's dial position.  The Federal Communications Commission (FCC) permitted it to move slightly up the dial to 99.5 MHz and get a boost in power.  The signal now covers a significant part of the larger and more lucrative Pensacola radio market.

In the late 1960s, WFTW-FM stopped simulcasting 1260 WFTW.  It began broadcasting a beautiful music format.  The station featured quarter-hour sweeps of mostly instrumental cover versions of popular songs, as well as Broadway and Hollywood show tunes.  The station would later flip to an adult contemporary format, and then later Top 40/CHR in October 1985. It was one out of two CHR stations in the Fort Walton Beach and Destin areas, with the other being WNUE. The station's call letters were changed to WKSM in April 1988, retaining its CHR format. The format lasted until mid-November 1991, and the station switched to its current album rock format. This left WNUE the only Top-40 station in Fort Walton Beach until it became a sports radio format in 1992.

In 1993, WKSM and WFTW were sold for $1 million to Holiday Broadcasting.  In 2003, Cumulus Media acquired the two stations.

References

External links
99 Rock - Official website

KSM
Cumulus Media radio stations
1965 establishments in Florida
Radio stations established in 1965
Mainstream rock radio stations in the United States